Gjorgji Talevski (born 15 March 1976) is a former Macedonian professional basketball Power forward who played for clubs like MZT Aerodrom, and Pelister.

External links

References

1976 births
Macedonian men's basketball players
Living people
KK MZT Skopje players
Power forwards (basketball)